Blue River is a tributary of the McKenzie River in Linn and Lane counties in the U.S. state of Oregon. From its source at the confluence of Mann and Wolf creeks in the Cascade Range, it flows generally southwest to join the McKenzie near the community of Blue River.

The river's watershed lies almost entirely within the Willamette National Forest, dominated by western hemlock and Douglas-fir. Blue River was named for the striking blue color that apparently comes from its rocky bed.

Course
Blue River begins on the western slopes of the Cascade Range at the confluence of Mann and Wolf creeks in Linn County, slightly north of its border with Lane County. Forest Road 15 follows the river along its right bank from its source to about river mile (RM) 9 or river kilometer (RK) 14.

The upper river receives Quentin Creek from the right before crossing the border into Lane County. Just southwest of the border, the river receives Cook Creek, also from the right. Just beyond RM 9 (RK 14), the river passes under Forest Road 15 and receives Tidbits Creek from the right. At this point, the river turns sharply south, and Forest Road 15 runs along its left bank.

A fraction of a mile beyond the mouth of Mona Creek, Lookout Creek enters from the left near the Lookout Campground and Boat Launch, and Mona Campground is on the right. Blue River and the reservoir curve to the southwest, and Scott Creek enters from the right at RM 5 (RK 8). On the opposite shore at this point is Saddle Dam and its boat launch, which lie outside the national forest. At this point, Forest Road 15 leaves the river and the reservoir and heads south to Oregon Route 126.

Below the dam, Forest Road 125 runs parallel to the river along its right bank. The river passes a United States Geological Survey stream gauge below the dam, and then Simmonds Creek enters from the right. Blue River joins the McKenzie River at the community of Blue River,  from the McKenzie's confluence with the Willamette River.

See also 
 List of rivers of Oregon

References

External links
 McKenzie Watershed Council

Rivers of Oregon
Rivers of Lane County, Oregon